Li Jian or Jian Li may refer to:

Footballers
Li Jian (footballer, born 1977), Chinese football goalkeeper
Li Jian (footballer, born March 1985), Chinese football defender
Li Jian (footballer, born September 1985), Chinese football goalkeeper who represents Hong Kong internationally
Li Jian (footballer, born 1986), Chinese football forward
Li Jian (footballer, born 1989), Chinese football midfielder

Others
Li Jian (singer) (born 1974), Chinese singer-songwriter
Jian Li (engineer)